FL Lyrae is the variable star designation for an eclipsing binary star system in the northern constellation of Lyra. The combined apparent magnitude of the pair is 9.36, which means they are too faint to be seen with the naked eye. Parallax measurements put the system at a distance of around 437 light years from the Sun. This star system was in the view field of the Kepler space telescope during 2009−2014, which allowed monitoring during that spacecraft's mission.

The variability of this system was discovered from photographic plates in 1935. It is a binary star system with an orbital plane that is nearly aligned with the line of sight to the Earth. Once every 2.1781542 day orbit, each of the closely orbiting stars eclipses its partner, causing a net magnitude drop to 9.4 during the primary eclipse and to magnitude 9.1 when the secondary component is eclipsed. The secondary member covers 51% of the larger star during the primary eclipse, while the primary covers 88% of the secondary.

The measureable properties of an eclipsing binary can allow the physical parameters of the individual components to be worked out in some detail. The primary component has 122% of the Sun's mass, spans 128% of the radius of the Sun, and is emitting 217% of the Sun's luminosity. It is most likely an F-type main sequence star with a stellar classification of F8. The secondary is smaller, with 96% of the mass of the Sun, 96% of the Sun's radius, and radiates just 65% of the Sun's luminosity. This is a G-type main sequence star of class G8.

Based upon light variations measured during eclipses by the Kepler spacecraft, the system may contain a third body with twice the mass of Jupiter and an orbital period of under seven years. As of 2015, this remains to be confirmed.

References 

G-type main-sequence stars
F-type main-sequence stars
Algol variables
Lyra (constellation)
Durchmusterung objects
179890
094335
Lyrae, FL